Les Légions Noires (also known as The Black Legions in English, or simply abbreviated to LLN) was an avant-garde group of French underground black metal musicians and their bands, centered mostly around the city of Brest, in Brittany. The bands involved limited their releases to very small numbers (often just enough to get to the other circle members), and distributed them among friends and close workers.

History 
Possibly the circle was formed in the late 1980s, early 1990s, in response to the supposed Norwegian "Black Metal Inner Circle". According to a 2005 series in Terrorizer magazine on the history of black metal, "A bunch of corpsepainted characters, rumoured to be drawn from such acts as Mütiilation, Torgeist and Vlad Tepes named themselves the 'Black Legions' as a tribute to the so-called 'Black Mafia' Norwegian BM heroes Darkthrone and Burzum, who were supposedly ready to terrorize Christians a couple of years before." The first recordings of LLN members came about in the early 1990s, and their influence was acknowledged in the same issue of Terrorizer: "One should never count out France, primarily as the home of the inscrutably influential Black Legions of ridiculous rawness during the mid-90s."

Regarding their influences, Wlad Drakksteim of Vlad Tepes referred, in an interview with Petrified magazine, to Hellhammer and especially Bathory: "Every True Black Metal Horde should play in old Bathory style." When asked about the "Norwegian Black Metal Mafia", he said, "Norwegian mafia did lots of 'bad' things to this world. With Euronymous death MAYHEM is definitely dead and it's better like that as it will help Black Metal to return to darkness. [Euronymous] must be in peace now so I don't complain [lament?] him. And about Varg Vikernes (BURZUM) I don't have any opinion. WE have OUR opinions and he certainly knows them so..."

The best-known bands of the LLN are Mütiilation (the one-man band formed by William Roussel, also known as Meyhna'ch), Belketre, Torgeist, and Vlad Tepes.

Vlad Tepes have been outspoken in the goals of their black metal: "We are Black Legions of Satan, we are the immortal warriors of Black imperial blood. We are here to pervert christian worms and they shall face the Black holocaust. It's near!"

While none of the bands involved in Les Légions Noires released any new material from 1998 to 2014, Belketre released a new EP entitled Ryan Èvn-A in 2015. It is unclear if the bands were inactive during that time or simply preferred not to release their material to the public.

Discography 
 Mütiilation: Hail Satanas We Are the Black Legions (1994)
 Vlad Tepes: War Funeral March (1994)
 Vlad Tepes / Belketre: March to the Black Holocaust (1995)
 Mütiilation: Vampires of Black Imperial Blood (1995)
 Vlad Tepes / Torgeist: Black Legions Metal (1996)
 Belketre: Ambre Zuèrkl Vuordhrévarhtre (1996)
 Vlad Tepes: La Morte Lune (1997)

Bands and projects

Notes

References 
 
 
 

Black metal
Music scenes
French music
French rock music